In Tibetan cuisine, Tu is a cheese cake, made with yak butter, brown sugar and water, made into a pastry.

See also
 List of pastries
 List of Tibetan dishes

References

Tibetan pastries
Cheese desserts
Cheesecakes